The artery to the ductus deferens (deferential artery) is an artery in males that provides blood to the ductus deferens.

Anatomy

Origin 
The artery arises from the superior vesical artery (usually), or from the inferior vesical artery.

Course, anastomoses, and distribution 
It accompanies the ductus deferens into the testis, where it anastomoses with the testicular artery; in this way it also supplies blood to the testis and epididymis. A small branch also supplies the ureter.

See also
 Spermatic cord

Additional Images

References

External links
  - "Inguinal Region, Scrotum and Testes: Layers of the Spermatic Cord"

Arteries of the abdomen